Delicious Monster is a software company based in Seattle, Washington, that sells the shareware software program Delicious Library. Its founders are Wil Shipley, one of the three co-founders of The Omni Group, and Mike Matas, who worked as an interface designer at The Omni Group. Matas left Delicious Monster in 2005 to work for Apple, but left the company in July 2009 to found Push Pop Press.

The company's name is based on the name of a plant that grows in the rainforests of tropical America, Monstera deliciosa.  It is colloquially known as the Swiss cheese plant.

Wil Shipley joined Apple in 2021 and published a blog post indicating that Delicious Library will not be further developed beyond keeping the software runnable on newer versions of macOS.

Products

Delicious Library

In November 2004, Delicious Monster released Delicious Library as a Mac OS X-only media library catalog application and generated $250,000 worth of sales. The software went on to win several Apple Design Awards, including Best Mac OS X User Experience and runner-up Best Product New to Mac OS X in 2005 and Best Mac OS X Leopard Application in 2007. It is currently available as version 3.

In mid-2022 the official website showed the default page for the macOS Server and the Delicious Software program was not able to receive any updates anymore. Delicious Library is still available in the Mac App Store.

References

External links

Wired slideshow of Delicious Monster
Seattle P-I article on Delicious Monster
Review of Delicious Library

Companies based in Seattle
Software companies of the United States
Macintosh software companies
Apple Design Awards recipients